Vivek Narayan Shejwalkar (born 13 June 1947)  is an Indian politician. He was elected to the Lok Sabha, lower house of the Parliament of India from Gwalior, Madhya Pradesh in the 2019 Indian general election as member of the Bharatiya Janata Party.

His father Narain Krishna Rao Shejwalkar was elected to 6th Lok Sabha and 7th Lok Sabha from Gwalior (Lok Sabha constituency) in 2019. He was also a Mayor of Gwalior Municipal Corporation.

References

External links
Official biographical sketch in Lok Sabha website

India MPs 2019–present
Lok Sabha members from Madhya Pradesh
Living people
Bharatiya Janata Party politicians from Madhya Pradesh
People from Gwalior
Jiwaji University alumni
1947 births
Mayors of places in Madhya Pradesh